Collapser is the second album released by Banner Pilot.  It was released on September 1, 2009 on Fat Wreck Chords.  330 copies were made on colored vinyl.  Collapser was the #14 album of 2009 on punknews.org.

Track listing
 "Central Standard" - 2:50
 "Pensacola" - 1:49
 "Greenwood" - 3:10
 "Starting At An Ending" - 3:16
 "Skeleton Key" - 3:02
 "Northern Skyline" - 2:58
 "Drains To The Mississippi" - 3:05
 "Farewell To Iron Bastards" - 2:41
 "Empty Lot" - 2:21
 "Hold Me Up" - 2:47
 "Losing Daylight" - 2:54
 "Write It Down" - 3:23

Personnel
Nick Johnson - Guitar, Vocals
Nate Gangelhoff - Bass
Corey Ayd - Guitar, Backing Vocals
Danny Elston-Jones - Drums

References

2009 albums
Fat Wreck Chords albums
Banner Pilot albums